Arthur Norman Lewis (13 June 1908 – 1972) was an English footballer who played in the Football League for Bradford Park Avenue, Tranmere Rovers, Wolverhampton Wanderers and Stoke City.

Career
Lewis was born in Wolverhampton and played for his works team Sunbeam Motors before being signed by Wolverhampton Wanderers in 1928 at the age of 20. He played 30 times for Wolves in 1928–29 before signing for Stoke City. Lewis spent six years at the "Potters" making 169 appearances for the club. He was signed by Stoke in 1929 as cover for Dick Williams. He took over from Williams in 1930–31 playing in 39 matches. Lewis then played 46 times in 1931–32 but then suffered injury and missed the whole 1932–33 season as Stoke gained promotion. He played regularly for the next three seasons but lost his place to Norman Wilkinson in 1936. He latter assisted Bradford Park Avenue and Tranmere Rovers where he won a Third Division North title in 1938.

Career statistics
Source:

References

1908 births
1972 deaths
Footballers from Wolverhampton
English footballers
Association football goalkeepers
Wolverhampton Wanderers F.C. players
Stoke City F.C. players
Bradford (Park Avenue) A.F.C. players
Tranmere Rovers F.C. players
English Football League players